Cresswell Road is a designated state route in the Northern Territory of Australia. Forming part of State Route 16, it connects Calvert Road near Elliott with the Tablelands Highway and the Barkly Stock Route.

See also

References

Roads in the Northern Territory